The following table indicates the party of elected officials in the U.S. state of New Mexico:
Governor
Lieutenant governor
Secretary of state
Attorney general
State auditor
State treasurer
Commissioner of public lands

The table also indicates the historical party composition in the:
State Senate
State House of Representatives
State delegation to the U.S. Senate
State delegation to the U.S. House of Representatives

For years in which a presidential election was held, the table indicates which party's nominees received the state's electoral votes.

Pre-statehood (1846–1911)

Statehood (1911–present)

See also
Politics in New Mexico

References

Government of New Mexico
New Mexico
Politics of New Mexico